Braunschweig (F260) is the lead ship of the Braunschweig-class corvette of the German Navy.

Developments 
The K130 Braunschweig class (sometimes Korvette 130) is Germany's newest class of ocean-going corvettes.

They feature reduced radar and infrared signatures ("stealth" beyond the s) and will be equipped with two helicopter UAVs for remote sensing. Recently, the German Navy ordered a first batch of two UMS Skeldar V-200 systems for the use on the Braunschweig-class corvettes. The hangar is too small for standard helicopters, but the pad is large enough for Sea Kings, Lynx, or NH-90s, the helicopters of the German Navy.

The German Navy has ordered the RBS-15 Mk4 in advance, which will be a future development of the Mk3 with increased range —— and a dual seeker for increased resistance to electronic countermeasures. The RBS-15 Mk3 has the capability to engage land targets.

In October 2016 it was announced that a second batch of five more frigates is to be procured from 2022–25. The decision was in response to NATO requirements expecting Germany to provide a total of four corvettes at the highest readiness level for littoral operations by 2018, and with only five corvettes just two can be provided.

Construction and career 
Braunschweig was laid down on 3 December 2004 and launched on 19 April 2006 in Hamburg. She was commissioned on 16 April 2008.

Braunschweig and KRI Bung Tomo conducted an exercise UNIFIL on 24 June 2017. 19 August 2020, Braunschweig served as a platform for shipborne trials of 2 UMS Skeldar V-200 UAV.

Gallery

References

Bibliography 
 

Corvettes 
Stealth ships
Braunschweig-class corvettes
2006 ships